Magaadu is a 1990 Indian Telugu-language film directed by K. Madhu. The film stars Rajasekhar, Jeevitha, Lissy and Murali Mohan. The film is a remake of the 1988 Malayalam film Moonnam Mura. Rajasekhar won the Filmfare Award for Best Actor – Telugu. It was dubbed and released in Tamil as Meesaikaran which was also a success. It marked Jeevitha Rajasekhar's last acting performance prior to her retirement.

Plot

Cast 
 Rajasekhar as Vikram
 Jeevitha
 Lissy as Swetha
 Murali Mohan
 Thiagarajan
 R. Sarathkumar as SP Raju

Reception 
Griddaluru Gopalrao of Zamin Ryot on 31 August 1990 gave a favourable review for the film, appreciating the novel storyline, tight screenplay and Rajasekhar's performance.

References

External links 
 

1990 films
Indian action films
Telugu remakes of Malayalam films
1990s Telugu-language films
Films scored by Raj–Koti
1990 action films